Illustrierter Beobachter (Illustrated Observer) was an illustrated propaganda magazine which the German Nazi Party published. It was published from 1926 to 1945 in Munich, and edited by Hermann Esser.

It began as a monthly publication and its first issue showed members of the Bamberger Nationalist Party marching in front of a Jewish Synagogue and denounced Jacob Rosny Rosenstein, a potential Nobel Laureate as a "disgrace to German culture". Special editions denounced England and France for starting the war.

See also
Other newspapers of Nazi Germany:
Der Angriff ("The Attack"), Josef Goebbels' Berlin-based newspaper
Berliner Arbeiterzeitung ("Berlin Workers Newspaper"), Gregor and Otto Strasser's newspaper, representing the Strasserite wing of the Nazi Party
Panzerbär ("The Panzer Bear"), a tabloid Nazi newspaper intended for the troops defending Berlin from the Red Army
Das Reich, a weekly newspaper founded by Goebbels
Das Schwarze Korps ("The Black Corps"), the official newspaper of Heinrich Himmler's Schutzstaffel (SS)
Der Stürmer ("The Stormer"), Julius Streicher's Nuremberg-based virulently antisemitic and frequently semi-pornographic newspaper
Völkischer Beobachter ("People's Observer"), the official Nazi newspaper, published in Munich

 Kladderadatsch, liberal satirical German-language magazine

References

External links
Covers of the magazine
 Georg Elser: Illustrierter Beobachter — Articles on Georg Elser's failed attempt to assassinate Adolf Hitler at the Bürgerbräukeller in Munich on 9 November 1939 (in German)
 "Frankreichs Schuld" — "France's Guilt", a 1940 special issue featuring a racist and anti-Semitic caricature on the cover (in German)

1926 establishments in Germany
1945 disestablishments in Germany
Defunct political magazines published in Germany
German-language magazines
Monthly magazines published in Germany
Magazines established in 1926
Magazines disestablished in 1945
Magazines published in Munich
Nazi propaganda
Fascist newspapers and magazines